The 2012 Masters Tournament was the 76th Masters Tournament, held April 5–8 at Augusta National Golf Club in Augusta, Georgia. Bubba Watson won the year's first major championship on the second hole of a sudden-death playoff, defeating Louis Oosthuizen. It was his first major title and his fourth victory on the PGA Tour. Watson was the eighth consecutive first-time major champion, and the 14th winner in as many majors. He won a second Masters two years later in 2014.

Two pre-tournament favorites, Tiger Woods and Rory McIlroy, both finished at 293 (+5) in a tie for 40th place. Phil Mickelson was in the final pairing and in contention during the final round, but a triple-bogey six on the fourth hole knocked him back and he finished two strokes behind, in a four-way tie for third. Bo Van Pelt posted the lowest round of the tournament with a 64 (−8) early on Sunday, which propelled him up the leaderboard 35 places to tie for 17th.

It was the first playoff in three years at the Masters; Ángel Cabrera won on the second extra hole in 2009.

Course

Field
The Masters has the smallest field of the four major championships. Officially, the Masters remains an invitation event, but there is a set of qualifying criteria that determines who is included in the field. Each player is classified according to the first category by which he qualified, but other categories are shown in parentheses.

Golfers who qualify based solely on their performance in amateur tournaments (categories 6–10) must remain amateurs on the starting day of the tournament to be eligible to play.

Three players were appearing in their first major:  Kelly Kraft, Corbin Mills and Randal Lewis.  Twelve others were appearing in their first Masters:  Keegan Bradley, Patrick Cantlay, Bryden Macpherson, Kevin Chappell, Robert Garrigus, Webb Simpson, Harrison Frazar, Kyle Stanley, Scott Stallings, Brendan Steele, Bae Sang-moon and Gonzalo Fernández-Castaño.

Notable absences included Mark O'Meara (injured), Ernie Els and Retief Goosen (not ranked high enough).  O'Meara had appeared in the previous 27 Masters, Els in the previous 18, and Goosen in the previous 12. (Els would win the Open Championship in July to ensure an invitation to the next five Masters.)

1. Past Masters Champions
Ángel Cabrera (2,11), Fred Couples (11), Ben Crenshaw, Trevor Immelman (11), Zach Johnson (18,19), Bernhard Langer, Sandy Lyle, Phil Mickelson (13,15,16,17,18,19), Larry Mize, José María Olazábal, Charl Schwartzel (11,15,18,19), Vijay Singh (15,17), Craig Stadler, Tom Watson, Mike Weir, Tiger Woods (2,4,11,16,18,19), Ian Woosnam

Mark O'Meara withdrew shortly before his tee time due to injury.

(Past champions not playing: Tommy Aaron, Jack Burke Jr., Billy Casper, Charles Coody, Nick Faldo, Raymond Floyd, Doug Ford, Bob Goalby, Jack Nicklaus, Arnold Palmer, Gary Player and Fuzzy Zoeller.  Player joined Nicklaus and Palmer to serve as "honorary starters" and teed off on the first day at the first hole to kick off the tournament.)

2. Last five U.S. Open Champions
Lucas Glover (16), Graeme McDowell (18,19), Rory McIlroy (11,12,16,18,19)

3. Last five British Open Champions
Stewart Cink, Darren Clarke (13,18), Pádraig Harrington (4), Louis Oosthuizen (18,19)

4. Last five PGA Champions
Keegan Bradley (14,15,16,17,18,19), Martin Kaymer (18,19), Yang Yong-eun (12,17,18,19)

5. Last three winners of The Players Championship
K. J. Choi (11,15,17,18,19), Tim Clark, Henrik Stenson

6. Top two finishers in the 2011 U.S. Amateur
Patrick Cantlay (a), Kelly Kraft (a)

7. Winner of the 2011 Amateur Championship
Bryden Macpherson (a)

8. Winner of the 2011 Asian Amateur
Hideki Matsuyama (a)

9. Winner of the 2011 U.S. Amateur Public Links
Corbin Mills (a)

10. Winner of the 2011 U.S. Mid-Amateur
Randal Lewis (a)

11. The top 16 finishers and ties in the 2011 Masters Tournament
Jason Day (12,15,17,18,19), Luke Donald (15,16,17,18,19), Ross Fisher, Edoardo Molinari, Geoff Ogilvy (17,18,19), Ryan Palmer, Justin Rose (15,16,17,18,19), Adam Scott (15,16,17,18,19), Brandt Snedeker (15,16,17,18,19), Steve Stricker (15,16,17,18,19), Bo Van Pelt (15,17,18,19), Lee Westwood (12,18,19)

12. Top 8 finishers and ties in the 2011 U.S. Open
Kevin Chappell, Sergio García (18,19), Robert Garrigus, Peter Hanson (18,19)

13. Top 4 finishers and ties in the 2011 British Open Championship
Thomas Bjørn (18,19)

Dustin Johnson (15,16,17,18,19) withdrew with a back injury prior to the start of the tournament.

14. Top 4 finishers and ties in the 2011 PGA Championship
Jason Dufner (15,17,18,19), Anders Hansen (18,19), Robert Karlsson (18,19), David Toms (15,16,17,18,19), Scott Verplank

15. Top 30 leaders on the 2011 PGA Tour official money earnings list
Aaron Baddeley (17,18,19), Jonathan Byrd (17), Bill Haas (16,17,18,19), Charles Howell III (17), Freddie Jacobson (16,17,18,19), Matt Kuchar (17,18,19), Martin Laird (18,19), Hunter Mahan (16,17,18,19), Kevin Na, Rory Sabbatini, Webb Simpson (16,17,18,19), Nick Watney (16,17,18,19), Bubba Watson (16,17,18,19), Mark Wilson (16,17,19), Gary Woodland (17)

16. Winners of PGA Tour events that award a full-point allocation for the season-ending Tour Championship, between the 2011 Masters Tournament and the 2012 Masters Tournament
Harrison Frazar, Sean O'Hair, Scott Stallings, Kyle Stanley (19), Brendan Steele, Johnson Wagner

17. All players qualifying for the 2011 edition of The Tour Championship
Chez Reavie, John Senden (18,19)

18. Top 50 on the final 2011 Official World Golf Ranking list
Bae Sang-moon (19), Paul Casey (19), Simon Dyson (19), Gonzalo Fernández-Castaño, Rickie Fowler (19), Jim Furyk (19), Miguel Ángel Jiménez, Kim Kyung-tae (19), Francesco Molinari (19), Ian Poulter (19), Álvaro Quirós (19)

19. Top 50 on the Official World Golf Ranking list on March 25, 2012
Ben Crane, Paul Lawrie

20. International invitees
Ryo Ishikawa

Round summaries

First round
Thursday, April 5, 2012

Source:

Second round
Friday, April 6, 2012

Source:

Amateurs: Matsuyama (+1), Cantlay (+5), Kraft (+5), Macpherson (+9), Mills (+11), Lewis (+15).

Third round
Saturday, April 7, 2012

Source:

Final round
Sunday, April 8, 2012

Summary
For the third time in seven years, the Masters concluded on Easter Sunday. The leaderboard was active, as four players held at least a share of the lead during the final round. Louis Oosthuizen charged into the lead at the second hole with an albatross two on the par-5. It was only the fourth double eagle in Masters history and the first-ever on the second hole. The final pairing faltered: 54-hole  leader Peter Hanson never got it going, with three bogeys before he carded his first birdie at the 15th hole. Three holes earlier, Hanson shanked his tee shot on the par-3 12th short of the water, bogeyed, and fell from contention. On the front nine, three-time Masters champion Phil Mickelson pushed his tee shot left at the par-3 fourth and it caromed off a greenside grandstand. He made his second triple bogey of the week and came up two shots short of the playoff.

In the end, it came down to a three player race between Oosthuizen, Bubba Watson, and Matt Kuchar. Kuchar hit his approach at the 15th hole to three feet (0.9 m) and eagled to temporarily tie Oosthuizen at −9, but followed it with a bogey at the par-3 16th hole and finished two strokes back, in the four-way tie for third. After Watson made a two at the 16th for his fourth consecutive birdie, he was tied at the top with Oosthuizen at −10. Playing together in the penultimate pairing, both parred the 17th hole and were on the green in regulation at the uphill 18th. Oosthuizen missed a  birdie putt from the back shelf and Watson had  for his first major, but he missed the putt on the high side. After Watson tapped in, Oosthuizen holed his four-footer (1.2 m) to force a sudden death playoff.

Final leaderboard

Scorecard

Cumulative tournament scores, relative to par

Source:

Playoff
The sudden death playoff started at the par-4 18th hole, where both players hit the fairway and green, and similar to the final round, Bubba Watson was closer to the pin than Louis Oosthuizen. Oosthuizen narrowly missed his  birdie effort which gave Watson another opportunity to secure the title.

Both players hit poor drives to the right, and Oosthuizen's second shot ended up short of the green. The left-handed Watson, playing from the pine straw deep in the woods, hooked his approach shot nearly 90 degrees to within  of the hole. Oosthuizen chipped to the back of the green and narrowly missed his par putt to give Watson two putts to win. He lagged his first to a foot (0.3 m) and tapped in to become the Masters champion.

Scorecard

Cumulative playoff scores, relative to par

References

External links

Coverage from the PGA of America
Coverage on the European Tour's official site

2012
2012 in golf
2012 in American sports
2012 in sports in Georgia (U.S. state)
April 2012 sports events in the United States